The Secretary for Economy and Finance is a department of the Macau Government. The Secretariat is responsible for economic, financial and labour affairs in Macau and the region's economic co-operations with Mainland China.

Prior to 1999, the department was known as Secretariat for Economic Coordination.

Organisational structure 

The SEF is structured as of 2022:

 Macau Economic Service
 Finance Services Bureau
 Statistics and Census Bureau
 Labour Affairs Bureau
 Social Security Fund
 Gaming Inspection and Coordination Bureau
 Pension Fund
 Consumer Council
 Macau Trade and Investment Promotion Institute
 Macau Monetary Authority
 Human Resources Office
 Financial Intelligence Office (Independent, but known to be under SEF oversight)

List of Secretariats

Directors
 Lau Ioc Ip - Economic Services
 Anselmo L.S. Teng - Chairman of the Monetary Authority of Macau 
 Lee Peng Hong - President of the Macau Trade and Investment Promotion Institute

Chief of Office
 Lok Kit Sim

References

Economy and Finance, Secretariat for
Government departments and agencies of Macau
 Macau
Political office-holders in Macau
Positions of the Macau Government
1999 establishments in Macau